Southern Love is a 1924 British drama film directed by Herbert Wilcox and starring Betty Blythe, Herbert Langley and Randle Ayrton. It is based on the verse drama The Spanish Student by Henry Wadsworth Longfellow. It is known by the alternative title Woman's Secret.

Premise
Dolores, a young gypsy woman, escapes from an arranged marriage and makes a living as a dancer.

Cast
 Betty Blythe – Dolores
 Herbert Langley – Pedro
 Randle Ayrton – Count de Silva
 Warwick Ward – Dick Tennant
 Liane Haid – Countess de Silva
 Hal Martin – Gypsy

Production
After making Chu Chin Chow in Germany Herbert Wilcox was approached by other European film companies to make co productions. He picked a Viennese company hoping to break into the English market. Wilcox says he was unhappy with the story he was given so he decided to make his own story. Wilcox found filming in Vienna difficult. He launched the film with a mock bull fight in Albert Hall and says the film made a profit in England alone. He says Al Woods offered $250,000 for the US rights after he heard about the premiere but reneged after he saw the film.

Reception
The film debuted at Albert Hall in front of 10,000 people.

References

External links

1924 films
1924 drama films
1920s English-language films
Films based on works by Henry Wadsworth Longfellow
Films directed by Herbert Wilcox
British drama films
British silent feature films
British black-and-white films
Silent drama films
1920s British films